Kenan Pirić (born 7 July 1994) is a Bosnian professional footballer who plays as a goalkeeper for Cypriot First Division club AEK Larnaca and the Bosnia and Herzegovina national team.

Pirić started his career at Gradina, before joining Gent in 2013. A year later, he signed with Sloboda Tuzla. In 2017, Pirić moved to Zrinjski Mostar. The following year, he was transferred to Maribor, where he stayed for three years. After a short stint with Atromitos in 2021, he joined Göztepe in early 2022.

A former youth international for Bosnia and Herzegovina, Pirić made his senior international debut in 2018.

Club career

Pirić came through the youth academy of his hometown club Sloboda Tuzla, which he left in June 2012 to join Gradina. He made his professional debut against Velež on 25 August of the same year at the age of 18.

In August 2013, Pirić signed with Belgian team Gent. In the summer of 2014, he returned to Sloboda Tuzla. In February 2017, Pirić moved to Zrinjski Mostar.

On 13 December 2017, Slovenian side Maribor announced that Pirić would join them the following season. He made his competitive debut for the team against Mura on 29 July 2018 and managed to keep a clean sheet. He won his first trophy with Maribor on 15 May 2019, when they were crowned league champions.

In July 2021, Pirić signed a two-year deal with Greek outfit Atromitos. He made his competitive debut for the team against Olympiacos on 12 September, keeping a clean sheet in a goalless draw. In late December, he terminated his contract with Atromitos.

In January 2022, Pirić moved to Turkish side Göztepe on a deal until June 2023. He made his official debut for the club against Konyaspor on 3 April.

In June 2022, he joined Cypriot team AEK Larnaca on a two-year contract.

International career
Pirić was a member of the Bosnia and Herzegovina under-21 team. He made seven appearances during the 2017 UEFA European Under-21 Championship qualifiers in 2015 and 2016. He also served as team captain under coach Vlado Jagodić.

In May 2016, Pirić received his first senior call-up, for a friendly game against Spain and the 2016 Kirin Cup, but had to wait until 31 January 2018 to make his debut against Mexico.

Personal life
Pirić married his long-time girlfriend Erina in December 2018. Together they have a son named Eman.

Career statistics

Club

International

Honours
Zrinjski Mostar
Bosnian Premier League: 2016–17, 2017–18

Maribor
Slovenian PrvaLiga: 2018–19

References

External links

1994 births
Living people
Sportspeople from Tuzla
Bosniaks of Bosnia and Herzegovina
Bosnia and Herzegovina Muslims
Bosnia and Herzegovina footballers
Bosnia and Herzegovina under-21 international footballers
Bosnia and Herzegovina international footballers
Bosnia and Herzegovina expatriate footballers
Association football goalkeepers
OFK Gradina players
K.A.A. Gent players
FK Sloboda Tuzla players
HŠK Zrinjski Mostar players
NK Maribor players
Atromitos F.C. players
Göztepe S.K. footballers
AEK Larnaca FC players
Premier League of Bosnia and Herzegovina players
Slovenian PrvaLiga players
Super League Greece players
Süper Lig players
Cypriot First Division players
Expatriate footballers in Belgium
Expatriate footballers in Slovenia
Expatriate footballers in Greece
Expatriate footballers in Turkey
Expatriate footballers in Cyprus
Bosnia and Herzegovina expatriate sportspeople in Belgium
Bosnia and Herzegovina expatriate sportspeople in Slovenia
Bosnia and Herzegovina expatriate sportspeople in Greece
Bosnia and Herzegovina expatriate sportspeople in Turkey
Bosnia and Herzegovina expatriate sportspeople in Cyprus